Thecodont dentition is a morphological arrangement in which the base of the tooth is completely enclosed in a deep socket of bone, as seen in crocodilians, dinosaurs and mammals, and opposed to acrodont and pleurodont dentition seen in squamate reptiles. Notably, this appears to be the ancestral tooth condition in Amniota.  This morphology was once used as a basis for the now-defunct taxonomic group Thecodontia.

References

Dentition types
Archosaurs